The EC Artists' Library are a series of books released by Fantagraphics Books, which collect anthologies by artists and themes of the comics originally published by EC Comics.

Background

On July 23, 2011, Gary Groth, president at Fantagraphics Books, announced during the company panel at the Comic-Con International in San Diego that Fantagraphics had established an agreement with William M. Gaines Agent, Inc. to publish the EC Comic Library starting in 2012, with the aim to reintroduce the EC stories to new contemporary readers. The reprint run would feature all the EC comic material with the exception of MAD comics, whose rights belonged to another owner. Fantagraphics' publication would become the first EC Comics collection arranged by artist.

Format

Volumes of the series have been published in hardcover format measuring 7.25 inches × 10.25 inches (185 mm × 261 mm) and are printed in black-and-white. The books have been designed by Jacob Covey and each volume contains between 200 and 250 pages including the comics and extras. Individual volumes are also available bundled in a boxed set of four.

Volumes and box sets

Volumes

Box sets

References

External links
 Official page at the publisher (Fantagraphics Books) website
 Preview - Forty Whacks & Other stories
 Preview - Grave Business & Other stories

EC Comics
Fantagraphics titles
American comics
Comic book collection books
Crime comics
Horror comics
Science fiction comics
War comics